The table below lists the judgments of the Constitutional Court of South Africa delivered in 1997.

The members of the court at the start of 1997 were President Arthur Chaskalson and judges Lourens Ackermann, John Didcott, Richard Goldstone, Johann Kriegler, Pius Langa, Tholie Madala, Yvonne Mokgoro, Kate O'Regan and Albie Sachs. One seat was vacant, as at the end of 1996 Deputy President Ismail Mahomed was appointed Chief Justice of the Supreme Court of Appeal. In August 1997 Justice Langa was elevated to the post of Deputy President. A new judge to fill the open seat was not appointed until 1998.

References
 
 

1997
Constitutional Court
Constitutional Court of South Africa